The North Fork White River is a  tributary of the White River.  The river's source is Wall Lake in the Flat Tops Wilderness Area of Garfield County, Colorado.  It joins with the South Fork White River in Rio Blanco County to form the White River.

See also
 List of rivers of Colorado
 List of tributaries of the Colorado River

References

Rivers of Colorado
Rivers of Rio Blanco County, Colorado
Tributaries of the Colorado River in Colorado
Rivers of Garfield County, Colorado